Liv Dawson is an English pop singer-songwriter. She has released the Open Your Eyes and Bedroom EPs and the "Pushing 21" single.

Career 
Dawson has played support slots for Tom Walker, Jessie Ware, Honne, and a UK & European tour with Khalid.

She started out playing at small venues in London. Since then, she has gone on to play at festivals including British Summer Time, Wildlife, Latitude and The Great Escape.

Personal life 
Dawson was born in Shepperton, a commuter town in Surrey.

Discography

Extended plays

Singles

References

English women singer-songwriters
English women pop singers
Living people
People from Shepperton
21st-century English women singers
21st-century English singers
Year of birth missing (living people)